Vishaka Girls' High School is a girls' school in Badulla, Sri Lanka. It is a National School funded by the central government providing primary and secondary education.

History
The school was established in 1892 as a private school by the Methodist Church in Sri Lanka as the Girls High School, Badulla. In 1963 the school was converted to a public school and in 1993 was upgraded to a national school.

See also
Education in Sri Lanka

References

External links
School Website

1892 establishments in Ceylon
Educational institutions established in 1892
Girls' schools in Sri Lanka
National schools in Sri Lanka
Schools in Badulla District
Buildings and structures in Badulla